The Sacred Heart Cathedral of Shenyang is a Roman Catholic cathedral in Shenyang, Liaoning Province, China. It is commonly called Nanguan Catholic Church and Xiaonan Catholic Church, but officially it is the Sacred Heart of Jesus Cathedral in Shenyang since the bishop of Shenyang Diocese resides here. In 2006 the Vatican agreed to Paul Pei (Pei Jun Min) being installed as the Bishop of Shenyang.

History

Construction and use 
In June 1858, when the Second Opium War ended, China signed the "Tianjin Treaty" with Britain and France respectively, which stipulated "the establishment of Niu Zhuang as a trading port, Jesus and Catholics can freely preach; Rent any land to build houses, set up churches, hospitals, warehouses, etc.”(in ).

In 1838, the Apostolic Vicariate of Liaotung 遼東 / Manchuria and Mongolia 滿蒙獨立 (The Good News was brought to the Shenyang area by Jean Chenin (in ), a French missionary, who came in 1861 by way of Yingkou and rented a private house for the mission.

Architect 

As a missionary, before the Boxer Rebellion, he founded the mission of Tieling (in ). Between Fengtian and Tieling, he also established the Anxintai (in ) Catholic Foundation. In 1900, the Boxers forced him to flee from Tieling. 

Due to the outbreak of the Boxer Rebellion in 1900, many churches were damaged. Three months after the Boxer days, Father Lamasse was back in Shenyang. He used the Boxer indemnity to rebuild the cathedral, being at once an architect, foreman, mason, and also a bricklayer. In addition to the Sacred Heart Cathedral of Shenyang, he also designed Tieling Catholic Church, Heishan Catholic Churchin Liaoning, and Jilin Catholic Church in Jilin.

See also
 Christianity and Catholicism
 Christianity in China
 Roman Catholicism in China
 Chinese Patriotic Catholic Association
 List of Catholic cathedrals in China
 Catholic churches in Northeast China:
Dalian Catholic Church, Sacred Heart Cathedral of Shenyang, St. Theresa's Cathedral of Changchun, Sacred Heart Cathedral of Harbin, etc.
 Protestant churches in Northeast China:
Yuguang Street Church, Dongguan Church, Changchun Christian Church, Harbin Nangang Christian Church, etc

References

External links
 Shengyang Nanguan Catholic Church (The Shenyang City Government Web) (in Chinese)
 Chinese Catholicism – Its history, present status and future (Catholic Bishops' Conference of Japan, 2007) (in Japanese)
 Understanding the Roman Catholic Church in China (U.S. Catholic Christian Bureau, 2002) (in English)

20th-century Roman Catholic church buildings in China
Roman Catholic cathedrals in China
Churches in Shenyang
1926 establishments in China
Roman Catholic churches completed in 1926